Rixton-with-Glazebrook is a civil parish in the Borough of Warrington in Cheshire, England, to the east of the town of Warrington.  It contains seven buildings that are recorded in the National Heritage List for England as designated listed buildings, all of which are listed at Grade II.  This grade is the lowest of the three gradings given to listed buildings, applied to "buildings of national importance and special interest".  The parish is largely rural, and contains the villages of Hollins Green and Glazebrook.  The A57 road runs through the parish, and three of the listed buildings are milestones along this road.  The other listed buildings are a church, a war memorial, a railway station, and a former manor house.

References
Citations

Sources

Listed buildings in Warrington
Lists of listed buildings in Cheshire